Amanda Cottreau is a Canadian folk singer-songwriter based in Ottawa, Ontario. She is a member of Songwriters Association of Canada, and made it to round 2 of CBC searchlight contest 2015 with Lady Lover and featured vocalist on a second song, Little Bird.

Career
Cottreau begun her musical career as a lead background vocals in a worship band from 1998-2003 which was based in Kingston, Ontario. Later, she worked with Ryan Potter, an Ottawa-based musician and producer. In November 2010, she released her first solo album Universe in a Soft Shell. In 2012, one of the tracks Couldn't Wait from the album Universe in a Soft Shell was featured on TV series Degrassi: The Next Generation.

Cottreau has performed over a hundred shows between Ontario, Quebec and Nova Scotia along with Lucila Al Mar, JustJamaal & Raymundo Pizana.

Discography

References

External links 
 

Canadian women singer-songwriters
Canadian singer-songwriters
Living people
Musicians from Nova Scotia
Musicians from Ottawa
People from Yarmouth, Nova Scotia
Year of birth missing (living people)